{{Infobox person
| name          =  Uttar Kumar
| notable_works = Dhakad Chhora
| image         = Uttar-8.jpg
| birth_date    = 7 October 1983
| birth_place   = Village- Behta Hajipur, Ghaziabad, Uttar Pradesh, India
| occupation    = Actor, film director, writer
| years active  = 2003–present
| spouse        = Rajbala Chaudhary
| children      = 2
| website       = 
| alma_mater    = Asian Academy of Film & Television
}}

Uttar Kumar is an Indian actor, writer, director, who mainly works in Haryanvi films. Kumar has acted in more than forty films including Dhakar Chhora'' released in 2004, which broke box office records by earning around 85 million for film worth of around 800,000.

Kumar is from the Western Uttar Pradesh. He is an alumnus of the Asian Academy of Film & Television.
Uttar Kumar known by his mononymous stage name Dhakad Chhora is an Indian actor, writer and director. Birth On 7 October 1973 a normal occurrence happened at the Home of Chaudhary Raj Singh and Laxmi Devi (Grand Parents) home in Ghaziabad district of Western Uttar Pradesh.

He is an Haryanvi film actor who mostly appears in haryanvi films. he started his career with Dhakad Chhora (2004) film and the film was very successful. film proved to be the milestone, which is called Sholay film of Haryanvi cinema. Then he starred in films such as Akad, Asar, Akad 2, Chakkar, Laat Sahab, Jhamela, Baanjh, Vikas Ki Bahu, Mahasangram, Saadgi (2019), Chowkidaar (2019), Master (2019), Aasra (2019), Fazeeta (2019),  ka Devar (2019), Nikhdoo (2019), Alajh PalajhChandro (2019), Jhamela (2019), Aasra (2019) and more than fifty hit films. He set a records of hit films in Haryanvi film industry.

Early life 
Uttar Kumar was born on 7 October 1973 in a middle class Jat farmer family in Ghaziabad district of Uttar Pradesh.

Career

Debut and early roles (2004–2017)
Uttar Kumar debut film Dhakad Chhora become a blockbuster hit. He is very famous for his stage name Dhakad Chhora.

Filmography

References

External links
 
 
 

1973 births
Living people
Indian male film actors
21st-century Indian male actors
Indian film directors
Haryanvi cinema